The following lists events in the year 2017 in Venezuela.

Incumbents
 President: Nicolás Maduro
 Vice President: Aristóbulo Istúriz (until January 4), Tareck El Aissami (starting January 4)

Governors
Amazonas: Liborio Guarulla then Miguel Rodríguez
Anzoátegui: Nelson Moreno then Antonio Barreto Sira
Apure: Ramón Carrizales
Aragua: Caryl Bertho then Rodolfo Clemente Marco Torres
Barinas: Zenaida Gallardo then Argenis Chávez
Bolívar: Francisco Rangel Gómez then Justo Noguera Pietri
Carabobo: Gustavo Pulido Cardier then Rafael Lacava
Cojedes: Margaud Godoy
Delta Amacuro: Lizeta Hernández
Falcón: Stella Lugo then Víctor Clark
Guárico: Ramón Rodríguez Chacín then José Manuel Vásquez
Lara: Henri Falcón (until October 16); Carmen Meléndez (starting October 16)
Mérida: Alexis Ramirez then Ramón Guevara
Miranda: Henrique Capriles Radonski then Héctor Rodríguez
Monagas: Yelitza Santaella
Nueva Esparta: Carlos Mata Figueroa then Alfredo Díaz
Portuguesa: Reinaldo Castañeda then Rafael Calles
Sucre: Edwin Rojas
Táchira: José Vielma Mora then Laidy Gómez
Trujillo: Henry Rangel Silva
Vargas: Jorge García Carneiro
Yaracuy: Julio León Heredia
Zulia: Francisco Arias Cárdenas then Juan Pablo Guanipa then Magdely Valbuena then Omar Prieto

Events

For events regarding the protests, see Timeline of the 2017 Venezuelan protests.

February
14 February - The United States sanctions Vice President El Aissami over allegations of playing a role in drug trafficking, freezing his assets in the US and barring him from entering the country.
15 February - Venezuela bans CNN from the country after allegations of spreading propaganda.

October
15 October - The Bolivarian government Great Patriotic Pole won 18 of the 23 governorships while the opposition only 5 during the 2017 Venezuelan regional elections

December
3 December - President Nicolás Maduro announces the creation of a new cryptocurrency the petro.
10 December - The Bolivarian government Great Patriotic Pole won 306 of the 337 Mayorships during the 2017 Venezuelan municipal elections.

Deaths

1 January – Memo Morales, singer (b. 1937).
6 January – Octavio Lepage, politician (b. 1923).
26 June – Isaías Pimentel, tennis player (b. 1933)

References

 
2010s in Venezuela
Years of the 21st century in Venezuela
Venezuela
Venezuela